Read My Licks is the fifty-sixth studio album by American guitarist Chet Atkins.

David Hungate and Atkins again co-produce with a number of guest musicians. Suzy Bogguss contributes a lead vocal on "After You've Gone". She and Atkins released a duet album the same year. Steve Wariner joins Atkins in a vocal as well as a guitar duet on "Read My Licks".

At the Grammy Awards of 1994, "Young Thing" won the Grammy Award for Best Country Instrumental Performance.

Track listing
 "Young Thing" (Atkins) – 3:14
 "Mountains of Illinois" (Atkins, Pat Bergeson) – 4:10
 "After You've Gone" (Creamer, Layton) – 3:31
 "Every Now and Then" (Atkins, Goodrum) – 3:01
 "Somebody Loves Me Now" (R. L. Kass) – 4:07
 "Norway" (Claese Neeb) – 3:41
 "Read My Licks" (Allen, Jones) – 4:34
 "Take a Look at Her Now" (Bergeson, Kass) – 3:56
 "Around the Bend" (Atkins, Jerry Reed) – 3:45
 "Dream" (Johnny Mercer) – 4:35
 "Vincent" (Don McLean) – 3:48

Personnel
 Chet Atkins – guitar, vocals
 Suzy Bogguss – vocals
 Pat Bergeson – guitar, percussion
 David Hungate – bass
 John Jarvis – keyboards
 Randy Goodrum – keyboards
 Floyd Cramer – keyboards
 Darryl Dybka – keyboards
 Larry Knechtel – piano
 Jim Horn – saxophone
 George Benson – guitar
 Eric Johnson – guitar
 Mark Knopfler – guitar
 R. L. Kass – guitar
 Steve Wariner – guitar, vocals
 Paul Yandell – guitar
 Stuart Duncan – fiddle
 Lonnie Wilson – drums

References

External links
 Video of Atkins playing Vincent

1994 albums
Chet Atkins albums
Albums produced by Chet Atkins
Columbia Records albums